Eleyas (also Romanized as Eleyās and Elyās; also known as Elyās-e Ābezhdān and Elyās Moḩebbī) is a village in Abezhdan Rural District, Abezhdan District, Andika County, Khuzestan Province, Iran. At the 2006 census, its population was 321, in 59 families.

References

Populated places in Andika County